The 2011–12 Manhattan Jaspers basketball team represented Manhattan College during the 2011–12 NCAA Division I men's basketball season. The Jaspers, led by first year head coach Steve Masiello, played their home games at Draddy Gymnasium and are members of the Metro Atlantic Athletic Conference. They finished the season 21–13, 12–6 in MAAC play to finish in a tie for third place. They lost in the quarterfinals of the MAAC Basketball tournament to Siena. They were invited to the 2012 CollegeInsider.com Tournament where they defeated Albany in the first round before falling in the second round to fellow MAAC member Fairfield.

Roster

Schedule

|-
!colspan=9 style=";"| Exhibition

|-
!colspan=9 style=";"| Regular season

|-
!colspan=9 style=";"| MAAC tournament

|-
!colspan=9 style=";"| 2012 College Insider tournament

References

Manhattan Jaspers basketball seasons
Manhattan
Manhattan